The Island Junior Hockey League is a Junior "B" ice hockey league in Prince Edward Island, Canada, sanctioned by Hockey Canada.

History
Since being founded in 1996, the IJHL has been strictly a Junior "B" League—one tier below the Maritime Junior A Hockey League and two tiers below the Quebec Major Junior Hockey League which both draw from the same region.

The IJHL shares its name with the former Junior "A" league that played in the same region, the Island Junior Hockey League.

In 2002, the O'Leary Eagles won the Don Johnson Cup as Maritime Junior B champions. Nine years later, in 2011, the Kensington Vipers repeated the act as Maritime champions, following up their success again in 2013. The Don Johnson Cup has been generally dominated by the Nova Scotia Junior B Hockey League.

Teams

Former teams 

Evangeline Loggers/Pownal Metro Builders/Charlottetown Jr. B Abbies (2005-2013)
Holland College Hurricanes (2012-2015)
Kings County Sharks/Kings County Boathaulers/Down East Maniacs (became Eastern Maniacs in 2016)
O'Leary Eagles (2001–02)
Summerside Red Wings/South Shore Red Wings (became Western Red Wings in 2008)

Champions

See also

List of ice hockey teams in Prince Edward Island

References

External links
Island Junior Hockey League

Ice hockey leagues in Prince Edward Island
B